Shlisselburg, formerly Oreshek (Орешек) (1323–1611) and Petrokrepost (Петрокрепость) (1944–1992), is a town in Kirovsky District of Leningrad Oblast, Russia, located at the head of the Neva River on Lake Ladoga,  east of St. Petersburg. Population: 

The Shlisselburg Fortress and the town center are UNESCO World Heritage Sites.

History

Fortress

The city was founded in 1323 with a wooden fortress named Oreshek which was built by Grand Prince Yury of Moscow (in his capacity as Prince of Novgorod) on behalf of the Novgorod Republic in 1323.

After a series of conflicts, a peace treaty was signed at Oreshek on August 12, 1323, between Sweden and Grand Prince Yury and the Novgorod Republic.

In 1348 king Magnus Eriksson attacked and briefly took the fortress during his crusade in the region in 1348–1352. It was largely ruined by the time the Novgorodians retook the fortress in 1351.

In 1478 the Novgorod Republic was absorbed by the Muscovy who immediately started to strengthen their border with Sweden. The existing small citadel was demolished and a new stone fortress with seven towers was constructed, which occupied almost the entirety of Orekhovy Island.

In 1554–1555, during the Russo-Swedish war, the Swedes laid siege to the fortress, with no success. In response, Muscovites besieged Vyborg, with no success either.

During the Livonian war, in 1582 Swedish troops led by Pontus De La Gardie almost captured the fortress. After a row of artillery fire they managed to break into one of the towers, but were later repelled by Muscovites.

The fort was captured by Sweden in 1611 during the Ingrian War after nine months of siege, when the defenders lost every nine out of ten men. During the Ingrian Campaign of tsar Alexei Mikhailovich in June 1656 the fortress came under a siege by voevoda Potyomkin which lasted until November 1656 with no success.

In 1702, during the Great Northern War, the fortress was taken by Russians under Peter the Great in an amphibious assault: 440 Swedish soldiers defended the fort for ten days before surrendering. (See Siege of Nöteborg (1702)).

Peter renamed the fortress to Shlisselburg, a transliteration into the Cyrillic alphabet of Schlüsselburg. The name, meaning "Key-fortress" in German, which refers to Peter's perception of the fortress as the "key to Ingria".

During the Imperial period the fortress lost its military role and was used as a notorious political prison. Immediately after the Russian Revolution of 1917 the prisoners, both political and criminal, were released, and set the prison on fire.

Shortly before Shlisselburg was occupied by the German troops (8 September 1941), a garrison of 350 Red Army soldiers was sent to the fortress on Orekhovets island to bring supplies and munitions to the frontline. The garrison held the abandoned castle for 500 days preventing the Germans from landing there and cutting the last transit route from Leningrad to the mainland. Heavy artillery fire by the Germans destroyed all the buildings inside the fortress and part of the outer towers and walls, but despite numerous attempts the fortress was not captured. During Operation Iskra (18 January 1943) the siege of the fortress was lifted.

The war completely devastated the fortress. Of the original ten towers, the fortress retains only six (five Russian and one Swedish). Renovation of the walls and towers has been slow, although it is still underway. A stone monument in memory of the first Russo-Swedish peace treaty (1323) has been placed inside the fortress.

Tourists can reach the island from May to October via Shlisselburg or from the Northern bank of Neva, via Petrokrepost railway station with regular ferries that run every 10–15 minutes.

Town
A predecessor of the town was a posad that first appeared around the citadel on the island and in the late 15th–early 16th century shifted to both banks of the Neva. Once Muscovites rebuilt the old citadel into a powerful stronghold leaving no place for residential purposes, residents and merchants were only allowed to the island to seek shelter from advancing Swedish troops. A posad on the southern bank was more convenient for its population, unlike for those living on the northern coast, it was easier to flee the enemies to the southeast, into the Russian mainland. The southern posad of Oreshek was turned into a town in 1702 by Peter the Great.

In the course of Peter's administrative reform, Shlisselburg was included in Ingermanland Governorate (known since 1710 as St. Petersburg Governorate). In 1727, it became a part of Sankt-Petersburgsky Uyezd, and in 1755 Shlisselburgsky Uyezd was established. In 1914, Sankt-Peterburgsky Uyezd was renamed Petrogradsky Uyezd.

The Old Ladoga Channel that divides the town into two parts was constructed from 1719 to 1731 to ensure the safety of the vessel traffic along the southern coast of the dangerously turbulent Lake Ladoga. The plan of the channel was worked out by Emperor Peter I himself. In 1826 the channel became too shallow, so numerous locks, including those in the town, were built to maintain the depth of the channel. In 1861 construction of the new channel was begun, which runs between the old one and the lake. The old channel was finally abandoned in 1940, and what remains of it may still be seen in Shlisselburg.

One of the most notorious political prisoners of Shlisselburg fortress was Iustin Zhuk (1887–1919), anarcho-syndicalist rebel from the Kiev Governorate. During the Russian Revolution he was released from prison and found a job on the gunpowder works of Shlisselburg, where he joined and then headed a commune of pro-Bolshevik workers. Zhuk supported the revolutionary forces in Petrograd and arranged day care for the children of workers as well as sourced food from Ukraine, where he was born. He led a group of Red Guards from Shlisselburg that were dispatched to the Russian-Finnish borderland to halt an intrusion of White Finns towards Petrograd and died in an ambush near Gruzino railway station in 1919. One of the streets in downtown Shlisselburg is named in memory of Zhuk.

On February 14, 1923, Shlisselburgsky Uyezd was merged into Petrogradsky Uyezd. In January 1924, the uyezd was renamed Leningradsky. St. Petersburg Governorate was twice renamed, first Petrograd Governorate and subsequently Leningrad Governorate. On August 1, 1927, the uyezds were abolished. Shlisselburg was made a town of okrug significance and belonged to Leningrad Okrug. On August 19, 1930, Leningradsky Prigorodny District, with the administrative center in Leningrad, was established. On August 19, 1936, the district was abolished and Shlisselburg became the town of oblast significance.

During the Great Patriotic War Shlisselburg was swiftly occupied by the German troops (8 September 1941) that aimed to encircle Leningrad. On 18 January 1943 in the course of Operation Iskra Shlisselburg was retaken by the Red Army. As the railway connection to Leningrad via German-occupied Mga was still unavailable, two temporary railway passages over Neva were rapidly built in Shlisselburg, a temporary railway line over the ice, and shortly afterwards a wooden pile bridge. First train with supplies that went through Shlisselburg arrived in Leningrad on 7 February 1943.

In 1944, the town's name was changed to Petrokrepost (lit. 'Peter's fortress'). Shlisselburg regained its former name in 1992.

In 2010, the administrative structure of Leningrad Oblast was harmonized with its municipal structure, and Shlisselburg became a town of district significance, subordinated to Kirovsky District.

Administrative and municipal status
Within the framework of administrative divisions, it is incorporated within Kirovsky District as Shlisselburgskoye Settlement Municipal Formation. As a municipal division, Shlisselburgskoye Settlement Municipal Formation is incorporated within Kirovsky Municipal District as Shlisselburgskoye Urban Settlement.

Economy

Industry
There are several shipyards in Shlisselburg.

The main company operating in the city is Nevsky shipyard, which was founded in 1913 when the ship repair workshops were established. The main activities of the company are shipbuilding, ship repair, modernization and renovation and machine-building.

Transportation
The railway platform of Petrokrepost, which has passenger service to Ladozhsky railway station in St. Petersburg, is located on the other bank of the Neva opposite of Shlisselburg.

The A120 road, which encircles St. Petersburg, and the M18 Highway, which connects St. Petersburg and Murmansk, pass several kilometers south of the town.

The Neva and Lake Ladoga are navigable. In the beginning of the 19th century, a system of canals bypassing Lake Ladoga was built, which at the time was a part of Mariinsky Water System, connecting the Neva with the Volga River. In particular, the New Ladoga Canal connects the Volkhov and the Neva Rivers. It replaced the Old Ladoga Canal built by Peter the Great, which thus became disused and decayed. The canals collectively are known as the Ladoga Canal. The canals originate from the Neva in Shlisselburg.

Architecture

The town does not retain many historical buildings, apart from a handful of 18th-century churches. Perhaps the most remarkable landmark is the Old Ladoga Canal, started at the behest of Peter the Great in 1719, and completed under the guidance of Fieldmarshal Munnich twelve years later.

References

Notes

Sources

External links

 Official website of Shlisselburg 
 Unofficial website of Shlisselburg 
 Official website of the fortress museum
 Official website of the fortress museum 
 Article and pictures of Shlisselburg fortress

 
Cities and towns in Leningrad Oblast
World Heritage Sites in Russia
Forts in Russia
Castles in Russia
Forts in Sweden
1323 establishments in Europe
14th-century establishments in Russia
Populated places established in the 1320s
Shlisselburgsky Uyezd
Kirovsky District, Leningrad Oblast